Clarence Wilfred Wyatt (27 April 1904 – 6 July 1986) was an Australian rules footballer who played with Melbourne and St Kilda in the Victorian Football League (VFL).

Notes

External links 

1904 births
Australian rules footballers from Victoria (Australia)
Melbourne Football Club players
St Kilda Football Club players
1986 deaths